Sauhøi or Sauhøe is a mountain in Lom Municipality in Innlandet county, Norway. The mountain is surrounded by several other notable mountains including Bukkehøe and Lindbergtinden to the east; Bukkeholstindene and Tverrbottindene to the southeast; Stetinden and Stehøi to the south; Rundhøe to the southwest; Storbreahøe, Storbreatinden, Veslbreatinden, and Skagsnebb to the west, and Loftet to the northwest.

See also
List of mountains of Norway by height

References

Jotunheimen
Lom, Norway
Mountains of Innlandet